Anne Rosine Noilly-Prat (1825-1902), was a French businessperson.

She was the owner of the Noilly Prat from 1865. As such, she was one of the biggest business figures in France during the Second Empire.

References

1825 births
1902 deaths
19th-century French businesswomen
19th-century French businesspeople